The Hydra-Centaurus Supercluster (SCl 128), or the Hydra and Centaurus Superclusters, is a supercluster in two parts, the closest neighbour of Virgo Supercluster.

Hydra-Centaurus
The cluster includes four large galaxy clusters in the Centaurus part
Abell 3526 (Centaurus Cluster)
Abell 3565
Abell 3574
Abell 3581
and the proximate
Hydra Cluster (A1060) 
Antlia Cluster  (AS0636)

Apart from the central clusters, which are 150 to 200 million light years away, several smaller clusters belong to the group.

Within the proximity of this supercluster lies the Great Attractor, dominated by the Norma Cluster (Abell 3627).  This massive cluster of galaxies exerts a large gravitational force, causing all matter within 50 Mpc to experience a bulk flow of 600 km/s toward the Norma Cluster

Laniakea
A 2014 announcement says that the Centaurus Supercluster (Hydra–Centaurus) is just a lobe in a greater supercluster, Laniakea, that is centered on the Great Attractor. That supercluster would include the Virgo Supercluster, therefore including the Milky Way where Earth resides.

See also
 Abell catalogue
 Great Attractor
 Large-scale structure of the universe
 List of Abell clusters
 Supercluster

References

External links 
Complete detail of Hydra Supercluster on atlasoftheuniverse.com
Complete detail of Centaurus Supercluster on atlasoftheuniverse.com

 
Laniakea Supercluster
Galaxy superclusters